Roots Hall is a football stadium located in Southend-on-Sea, Essex, England. The stadium is the home ground of the Vanarama National League team Southend United. With a capacity of 12,392 Roots Hall is the largest football stadium in Essex. Plans are in place for a new 22,000 seat stadium at Fossetts Farm, though work has yet to begin on the new development.

History

Pre-Roots Hall (1900s–1940s) 
The site now occupied by Roots Hall is where Southend United had originally played their home games on their formation in 1906. Upon the outbreak of the First World War the area was designated for storage and Southend were forced out. After the war the club elected to move to a new ground at the Kursaal and Roots Hall first became a quarry for sand then a tipping site.

Relocation to Roots Hall (1950s) 
By the early 1950s Southend had moved to Southend Stadium off Sutton Road. The club did not own the ground and the dog track which encircled the pitch made it unsuitable for use as a football stadium. In 1952 the wasteland at the old Roots Hall site was purchased to build a new stadium for the club. Work on the ground could not begin immediately owing to the large quantities of rubbish which had been dumped on the site in the club's absence, which took nearly a year to clear. On 20 August 1955 Roots Hall hosted its first match, against Norwich City. The ground was declared open by the Secretary of the Football Association, Sir Stanley Rous. The ground remained the youngest in the Football League until the opening of Scunthorpe United's Glanford Park in 1988.

Roots Hall's construction had not been completed when the ground was opened, with some stands only running for a short distance along the touchline and others waiting to be concreted over. In addition to these problems, the pitch's drainage was unsuitable and by the end of the 1955–56 season it had to be completely relaid.

Ground development (1960s) 

With the pitch issue dealt with, Southend could concentrate on the matter at hand: completing the ground. The west bank roof, originally set back from the pitch, was extended forwards to the touchline creating a double-barrel effect, while work also commenced on finishing the terracing. The job was finally finished in 1964, after all 72 steps of the giant south bank had been concreted. The east stand was extended in both directions so it ran the full length of the touchline in 1966, and around the same time the club installed floodlighting. Finally the ground was finished, and had its finest day in 1979, when a ground record 31,033 fans packed the Hall to watch Liverpool in action in the FA Cup.

Recent work (1980s–present) 

By the mid-1980s, however, the club were struggling financially. In an effort to keep the club afloat, most of the south bank was sold off in 1988, and eventually the remainder was replaced in 1994 by a small two tiered all-seater stand, designed by then club chairman Vic Jobson. All this came after the west and east stands saw work in 1992, when the west bank was turned into an all-seated stand and the paddocks in the east had seating attached. The final stage of development at the Hall came in 1995, when the west stand roof was extended at either end to meet the south and north stands, with seating being installed in the north-west corner of the ground.

Development since has been mainly concentrated on the ground's facilities, in recent years the club opened a new ticket office and club shop, replaced the old style turnstiles with modern electronic ones and extended executive accommodation at the rear of the east stand. A new digital scoreboard was also added to the north stand roof in November 2012.

Relocation to Fossetts Farm 
In the 1990s Southend United started planning to leave Roots Hall for a proposed new ground at Fossetts Farm. In January 2007, the club received planning permission from both Southend and Rochford councils for the stadium, retail outlets, a hotel and new training facilities but this was subject to rubber-stamping from the Secretary of State. The Department for Communities and Local Government gave broad approval to the plans in March 2008 and planning permission was granted later the same month for the HOK-designed new stadium. Roots Hall has been sold to Sainsbury's, which has received planning permission to build a new supermarket on the site. Building work on Fossetts Farm was due to start in 2014, however due to issues with the supermarket development, as Sainsbury's had yet to complete the purchase of the former Prospects College site, which was required for access to the new store, work failed to commence. However, on 28 April 2017 new plans were submitted for the work which no longer involved Sainsbury's. The move to the new stadium was scheduled for December 2018.

Structure

Fairfield BMW East Stand 
The east stand is the main stand at Roots Hall, running along one side of the pitch. Originally designed as a section of seating with paddocks of terracing below, it was converted to an all seater stand in the 1990s. The stand also contains executive boxes and, in the back, the club offices. The dugouts are cut into the stand, covered by the main roof. The stand was originally much smaller and evidence of its extension along the touchline can be seen in the density of moss on the roof. According to the club website this stand contains 2,878 seats, but recently a small block of seats on the far right side was removed to house training goals.

Hi-Tec South Stand 

Originally a 72-step terrace, financial troubles in the mid-1990s saw the old terrace reduced dramatically before being replaced by a significantly smaller two-tier stand. The bottom tier forms part of the family enclosure, alongside part of the west stand. According to the club website this stand contains 2,029 seats.

Gilbert & Rose West Stand 
The west was also formerly a terrace, though it was converted into a stand by bolting seats (purchased second hand from Manchester City F.C.) onto the existing structure, reducing the total capacity to 3,337. Originally the terrace only ran the length of the touch-line but when the ground was improved in the 1990s the north-west corner was filled-in. This section is sometimes used for away supporters, depending on demand. The roof has a unique double-barrelled construction; originally the stand's cover was set back from the pitch, and when the club constructed cover for the front section of the old terrace they built another identical span. A small section of the west stand has been designated as the family stand, and Block W (at the north end of the stand) houses "The Blue Voice" singing section which provides game atmosphere. In August 2022, the club announced that the stand would be sponsored by estate agents Gilbert & Rose, becoming the Gilbert & Rose West stand, drawing attention online as it included the name of serial killer Rose West. The club announced later the same day that the stand would be renamed again.

Solopress.com North Stand 
The north stand, also known as the north bank, is another converted terrace. The roof has a semi-circular 'barrel' shape, similar to the west stand's original roof, with a scoreboard in the centre. Part of the north stand is designated for up to 1,200 away supporters, but if necessary the whole stand can be allocated to bring the allocation up to around 2,000 which has been achieved at large matches such as those against Manchester United F.C. and Chelsea F.C. During 2010–2013, whenever there were small away crowds, Blues fans were allowed into the north stand.

References 

Football venues in Essex
Southend United F.C.
Buildings and structures in Southend-on-Sea
Defunct rugby league venues in England
Sports venues completed in 1955
Football venues in England
English Football League venues
1955 establishments in England